Filimonovo toys are a type of Russian pottery craft produced in Odoyevsky District of Tula Oblast, Russia. The toys derive its name from the village of its origin, Filimonovo, and are moulded by hand from the bluish-grey local clay that fires into a pure white ceramic. The artists paint the figures with aniline dyes with motifs of brightly colored strips and spots.

Filimonovo toys are often clay whistles in the forms of women, horsemen, and assorted animals such as bears, cattle, and roosters. Figurine motifs of people or other animals hold chickens or roosters is also quite common.

References

Богуславская И. Я. Русская глиняная игрушка.—М.: Искусство, 1975.
Рогов А. П. Чёрная роза. Книга о русском народном искусстве.—М.: Современник, 1978.
Под ред. В. А. Барадулина Основы художественного ремесла.—М.: Просвещение, 1979.

External links
Filimonovo toys photo series
Official site of the museum "Filimonovskaya toy" 

Russian handicrafts
Ceramic art
Russian pottery
Traditional toys
Folk art
Clay toys